This is a non-exhaustive list of festivals held in Quebec.

Festivals by city
List of festivals and parades in Montreal

List of festivals

Gallery

See also

List of festivals in Canada 
Lists of festivals by province or region  
Culture of Quebec
Tourism in Quebec

References

External links

Search for festivals in Quebec
 Celtic Festival in Quebec City

Quebec music
Festivals, List of Quebec
Quebec
Quebec